The Blue line is a proposed rapid transit line in Taichung and will be operated by Taichung Metro.

Route description 

The Blue line will begin at the Port of Taichung and follows Taiwan Boulevard for its entire length until it reaches Taichung railway station. Then, it will cross the railway tracks and terminate in East District. The tracks will be elevated from the Port of Taichung until the border of Longjing District and Xitun District, where the tracks then proceed underground. The depot will be located in Longjing District near the Longjing Interchange of National Freeway 3.

History 
The planning of network of rapid transit in Taichung was initially started in 1990s. A prototype of rapid transit line running on Taiwan Boulevard (then known as Zhonggang Road) was first proposed in 1998, along with the current Green line and a third Red line, but never progressed past the planning stage.

During his term in office, Lin continued to advocate for a rapid transit line along the route. In October 2018, the Executive Yuan approved the feasibility study submitted by the Taichung City Government. In 2019, the line embarked on its overall planning phase with an estimated cost of $128.56 billion NTD.

References

Taichung Metro